Ulloa and 15th Avenue was a light rail stop on the Muni Metro L Taraval line, located in the Parkside neighborhood of San Francisco, California. The station opened with the first section of the L Taraval line on April 12, 1919 and was closed in 2017.

Closure

Like many stations on the line, Ulloa and 15th Avenue had no platforms; trains stopped at marked poles on 15th Avenue, and passengers crossed the parking lane to board. In March 2014, Muni released details of the proposed implementation of their Transit Effectiveness Project (later rebranded MuniForward), which included a variety of stop changes for the L Taraval line. The Ulloa and 15th stop was one of several stops that would be eliminated to increase stop spacing and reduce travel time. On September 20, 2016, the SFMTA Board approved the L Taraval Rapid Project. Early implementation of many changes, including elimination of Ulloa and 15th Avenue and several other stops, occurred on February 25, 2017.

References

Former Muni Metro stations
Railway stations closed in 2017
Railway stations in the United States opened in 1919
1919 establishments in California